Steve Owen (born 18 December 1974) is an Australian racing driver, currently co-driving for Team Sydney in the No. 22 Holden ZB Commodore alongside Chris Pither. He has competed in many forms of motorsport, including Karts, Formula Ford, Formula Holden, Sprint cars and Supercars. He is one of three dual champions of the Dunlop Super2 Series, alongside Dean Canto and Paul Dumbrell.

Career

Owen is a two-time winner of the V8 Supercar Development series, having won it in 2008 for Scott Loadsman Racing and 2010 for Greg Murphy Racing. Owen also has many years experience racing in Australia's leading motor racing series, the Supercars Championship.

Owen's most significant achievements in the Supercars Championship have been winning the 2015 Wilson Security Sandown 500 driving with Mark Winterbottom and a race win at the 2010 Armor All Gold Coast 600 as a co-driver for Jamie Whincup. He has also scored several podiums, most notably second at the 2010 and 2015 editions of the Bathurst 1000, and third at the 2013 Wilson Security Sandown 500.

Career results

Bathurst 1000 results

References

External links
 VESRIX 
 V8 Supercar profile 

1974 births
Formula Ford drivers
Formula Holden drivers
Living people
Racing drivers from Melbourne
Supercars Championship drivers
V8SuperTourer drivers
Blancpain Endurance Series drivers
24 Hours of Spa drivers
Australian Endurance Championship drivers
Garry Rogers Motorsport drivers
Dick Johnson Racing drivers